Late Night Tales presents Automatic Soul is a mix album compiled by Tom Findlay of English electronic music duo Groove Armada, released 3 November 2014 as part of the Late Night Tales series.

The mix features tracks from artists such as Mtume, Zapp, Donna Allen, The Gap Band, Alexander O'Neal and Thelma Houston. As Sugardaddy, Findlay and Tim Hutton recorded an exclusive cover version of Dennis Edwards’ "Don't Look Any Further" for the release.

Track listing

References

External links
Official Groove Armada website
Official Late Night Tales Presents Automatic Soul Page

2014 compilation albums
Automatic Soul